Robert Barr (12 December 1888 – 18 July 1961) was a British businessman and founder of the Barr & Wallace Arnold Trust.

Life
Born to a farming family in Wakefield, Barr gained a financial interest in vehicle touring at a young age. He later founded Barr & Wallace Arnold Trust. 

Barr married Edith Midgley in 1913 at age 25; they had seven children, Mary, Margaret, Robert, Veronica, Malcolm, Jean, Stewart.  Barr died at age 72.

References

People from Wakefield
English company founders
1888 births
1961 deaths
20th-century English businesspeople